Scutiger jiulongensis, also known as Juilong cat-eyed toad, is a species of frog in the family Megophryidae.
It is endemic to Jiulong County in southern Sichuan Province, China. Its natural habitats are subtropical or tropical moist montane forests, rivers, swamps, and freshwater marshes.

References

jiulongensis
Amphibians of China
Endemic fauna of Sichuan
Taxonomy articles created by Polbot
Amphibians described in 1999